Moaning is a sound made from the mouth and throat.

Moan may also refer to:

People
Farrah Moan, (Cameron Clayton, born 1993), an American drag queen
Henny Moan (born 1936), a Norwegian actress
Magnus Moan (born 1983), a Norwegian Nordic combined skier
Raymond Moan (born 1951), an Irish cricketer
Torgeir Moan (born 1944), a Norwegian engineer

Other uses
Moan (film), a 1999 gay pornographic horror film 
 "The Moan", a 2002 single by The Black Keys
 "The Moan", a song by Mount Eerie from the 2005 album "No Flashlight": Songs of the Fulfilled Night
 Moaning (band), an American band
 "Moanin'" (song), song composed by Bobby Timmons
 Moanin', jazz album by Art Blakey

See also

Moaner (disambiguation)
Mon (disambiguation)
Voice